AABA may refer to:

 AABA form, a musical form common in Tin Pan Alley songs
 All-American Basketball Alliance, a defunct basketball league
 All-American Basketball Alliance (2010), an unrelated all-white basketball league announced in 2010
 alpha-Aminobutyric acid, an isomer of the amino acid aminobutyric acid
 Altaba ticker symbol
 Rhyme scheme of the Rubaʿi, a type of Persian poem, also known as "Rubaiyat Quatrain"

See also
 Aaba, a village in the Koura District of Lebanon